The UD Quester is a line of heavy-duty commercial vehicle produced by UD Trucks with Volvo Group. It is also related with the new generation of the UD Quon series made in Japan.

About 
UD Trucks introduced Quester Project with Volvo at Bangkok on August 27, 2013. It is not sold in Japan. "The best of three worlds" Concept was adopted.

The Quester has two engine options, the 8-litre GH8 or 11-litre GH11E, with either 6 or 9-speed gearbox for the 8-litre engine and 9 or 12-speed gearboxes for the 11-litre engine.

The Side Rail Section is made of strong and durable rolling form steel and is available in thickness of 7.0 or 8.0 mm.

Models 
 CKE (4x2 Rigid): 21t
 CDE (6x2/2 Rigid): 31t
 CWE (6x4 Rigid): 34t
 CGE (8x4 Rigid): 41t
 CQE (8x2/2 Rigid): 41t
 GKE (4x2 Tractor Head): 21t
 GDE (6x2/2 Tractor Head): 31t
 GWE (6x4 Tractor Head): 34t

History 
In 2013, this project was started at Bangkok.

In 2017, it was started to sold in Ecuador　etc.

Name 
It's named by "quest".

In China, this model is named as KuTeng, and is sold by Dongvo.

In India, this model is sold under Pro 8000 series name by VE Commercial Vehicles Limited's brand Eicher Trucks and Buses. Available in dump truck and tractor configuration, equipped with VEDX8 engine delivering 280-350 hp.

See also 
 UD Trucks
 UD Quon
 UD Croner
 UD Kuzer
 UD SLF
 Volvo
 Volvo Trucks

References

External links 

 Official website

2013 establishments in Sweden
Cab over vehicles
UD trucks
Volvo Group